Orimattilan Pedot (abbreviated OPedot) is a sports club from Orimattila, Finland specialising in football and ice-hockey. The club was formed in 1967 and its main home ground is at the Orimattilan keskuskenttä.

Background

Orimattilan Pedot was originally established in 1967 as an ice-hockey club.  However, in recent years football has become the undisputed number one club sport with its low start-up costs.

A very important facility for the club is the Jalkapallohalli (Football Hall) which was opened in March 2008 as an indoor training space for the football club.  No longer is it necessary to train or play on snow, ice or a wooden floor.  The playing surface is FIFA-approved artificial turf.

The Orimattilan Pedot club recognises that team sports experiences and activities are important for the development of youngsters. Mutually shared moments of joy and disappointment for youngsters are something that sticks with them through life. The club may also be able to set a sound foundation for good quality of life and a sporty lifestyle.

The club has spent many seasons in the lower divisions of the Finnish football league.  For much of the last decade OPedot has participated in the Nelonen (Fourth Division) but at the end of the 2007 the club gained promotion to the Kolmonen (Third Division) where they stayed for three seasons.

Season to season

Club Structure
Orimattilan Pedot run a large number of teams including 1 men's team, 1 ladies team, 2 veteran's teams, 8 boys teams and 1 girls teams.  The club now has more than 200 pre-school and primary school age girls and boys who enjoy activities such as the club's Säästöpankkiliiga.

Present
In 2014 OPedot Men's Team finished in 4th place in Section 2 (Lohko 2) of the Nelonen. Pedot competed in Section 2 (Lohko 2) of the Nelonen administered by the Uusimaa SPL.  This is the 5th highest tier in the Finnish football system.

Current squad

2012 season
http://www.resultcode.fi/sarjat/sarja_sarjatilanne_ja_ottelut_nayta.php?sarja_id=105614&piiri_id=100005

2013 season
http://www.resultcode.fi/sarjat/sarja_sarjatilanne_ja_ottelut_nayta.php?sarja_id=106819&piiri_id=100005

2014 season
http://www.resultcode.fi/sarjat/sarja_sarjatilanne_ja_ottelut_nayta.php?sarja_id=108048&piiri_id=100005

Sources
Official First Team Website
Official Website
Suomen Cup
Orimattilan Pedot Facebook

Footnotes

Football clubs in Finland
Orimattila
1967 establishments in Finland